Florent Chaigneau (born 21 March 1984) is a French professional footballer who plays as a goalkeeper for US Montagnarde.

References

1984 births
Living people
French footballers
Association football goalkeepers
Ligue 1 players
Stade Rennais F.C. players
English Football League players
Brighton & Hove Albion F.C. players
FC Lorient players
French expatriate footballers
Expatriate footballers in England